"Another Love" is a song by Ian Lloyd and Stories released on 18 October 1974. The song was written by Bobby Flax and Larry Lambert (who also wrote "All I Need Is Your Sweet Lovin'" for Gloria Gaynor) and produced by Kenny Kerner and Richie Wise. The bisexual theme of the song proved controversial, and the band disbanded the following year.

References

1974 songs
LGBT-related controversies in music
Obscenity controversies in music
Bisexuality-related songs
American songs
Kama Sutra Records singles